Adil Rza bey oglu Isgandarov (5 May 1910 – 18 September 1978) was a Soviet and Azerbaijani director, stage and film actor and pedagogue. He was awarded the People's Artists of the Azerbaijan SSR (1959).

Biography
Isgandarov joined amateur pioneers association at 10. When he was 13, he played role as Karam in “Gachag Karam” play. After gaining fame in Ganja, he was brought to Baku. Isgandarov got his first education in director-actor field in Baku Technical School of Theatre. After graduation he got professional experience in Moscow from 1932 to 1936 and graduated from Lunacharsky State Institute for Theatre Arts in 1936. After returning to Baku, he worked at Azerbaijan State Academic National Drama Theatre as director, then chief director from 1936 to 1960. Isgandarov also worked at Azerbaijan State University of Culture and Arts named after Mirzaagha Aliyev from 1937 to 1956. He was elected as depute in 1955 and 1959 for Supreme Soviet of the Azerbaijan SSR. Isgandarov served as director of Azerbaijanfilm named after Jafar Jabbarly from 1966 to 1974.

Awards
Honored Art Worker of the Azerbaijan SSR (1938)
Order of the Badge of Honour (1938)
People's Artist of the Azerbaijan SSR (1943)
Order of the Red Banner of Labour (1946)
Stalin Prize (1948)
Order of Lenin (1949)
People's Artist of the USSR (1959)
Medal "For Valiant Labour in the Great Patriotic War 1941–1945"

Filmography

As actor

As director

See also
 List of People's Artists of the Azerbaijan SSR

References

External links
 

1910 births
1978 deaths
Actors from Ganja, Azerbaijan
People from Elizavetpol Governorate
Azerbaijan State University of Culture and Arts alumni
Communist Party of the Soviet Union members
Russian Academy of Theatre Arts alumni
Honored Art Workers of the Azerbaijan SSR
People's Artists of the Azerbaijan SSR
People's Artists of the USSR
Stalin Prize winners
Recipients of the Order of Lenin
Recipients of the Order of the Red Banner of Labour
Azerbaijani communists
Azerbaijani film directors
Azerbaijani male film actors
Azerbaijani theatre directors
Soviet Azerbaijani people
Soviet drama teachers
Soviet film directors
Soviet male film actors
Soviet theatre directors
Burials at II Alley of Honor